Raja Malaya Simha (or Raja Malaya Simhan) is a 1959 Indian Telugu/Tamil language film directed and produced by B. S. Ranga. This film is known to be the first Telugu film to contain sequences in Eastmancolor.

Plot

Cast 
Cast according to the opening credits of the film

Male cast
 Ranjan as Raja
 K. Sarangapani
 Rajanala
 Sayeeram as Bharavasingam
 Kulathu Mani as King
 Ganapathi Bhat as Malaya King
 Thodi Kannan as Dharmakirti
 Venkatesh as Raghupathi
 Krishnan
 G. K. Venkatesh

Female cast
 P. Rajasulochana as Chitralekha
 Sowcar Janaki as Malathi
 M. S. Draupadi as Manorama
 K. Suryakala as Sundari
 K. S. Angamuthu as Sugandhi
Ship Dance
  Cuckoo

Production 
Raja Malaya Simha was simultaneously shot in Tamil as Raja Malaya Simhan. Udayakumar wrote the dialogues and A. Maruthakasi penned the lyrics. The costumes were designed by V. N. Murthi.

Soundtrack 
The soundtrack was composed by Viswanathan–Ramamoorthy. All the tunes for all the songs for both languages are the same.

Tamil Songs 
All lyrics are by A. Maruthakasi.

Telugu Songs

References

External links 
 

1950s multilingual films
1950s Tamil-language films
1950s Telugu-language films
1959 films
Films directed by B. S. Ranga
Films scored by Viswanathan–Ramamoorthy
Indian multilingual films